The 2000 Junior Pan American Artistic Gymnastics Championships was held in Curitiba, Brazil, November 25–26, 2000.

Medal summary

References

2000 in gymnastics
Pan American Gymnastics Championships
International gymnastics competitions hosted by Brazil